Vladimir Alexeyevich Vasin (born 9 January 1947) is a former Soviet diver and Olympic champion. He competed at the 1972 Olympic Games in Munich, where he received a gold medal in springboard.

In 1989–1991 Vasin was the chairman of the All-Russian Olympic Committee. In 1991, after the USSR collapsed, the Soviet Olympic Committee ceased to exist, and the All-Russian Olympic Committee became an independent organization and was renamed the Russian Olympic Committee.
In February 1992, Vladimir Vasin resigned from his post, and Vitali Smirnov, the last chairman of the Soviet Olympic Committee, succeeded him.

See also
 List of members of the International Swimming Hall of Fame

References

External links
 

1947 births
Living people
Russian male divers
Soviet male divers
Olympic divers of the Soviet Union
Divers at the 1964 Summer Olympics
Divers at the 1968 Summer Olympics
Divers at the 1972 Summer Olympics
Olympic gold medalists for the Soviet Union
Olympic medalists in diving
Medalists at the 1972 Summer Olympics
Universiade medalists in diving
Universiade silver medalists for the Soviet Union
Medalists at the 1973 Summer Universiade
Presidents of the Russian Olympic Committee